Sittingbourne and Milton was an urban district in Kent, England, consisting of the settlements of Sittingbourne and Milton Regis.  It was abolished in 1974 under the Local Government Act 1972, and made part of the Swale district.

References

History of Kent
Districts of England abolished by the Local Government Act 1972
Urban districts of England
Sittingbourne